Reggies is a restaurant and music venue in Chicago, Illinois, United States.

Description 
Reggies contains three venues for concerts and functions:

 Reggies Music Joint with a standing capacity of 110
 Reggies Rock Club with a standing capacity of 400
 Bananna's Comedy Shack for stand-up comedy, small-band shows, and private parties.

History
Reggies opened on September 8, 2007. Since then, it has held many concerts for both local, national, and international musicians and bands.

References

Music venues in Chicago